United Nations Security Council Resolution 478, adopted on 20 August 1980, is one of two General Assembly resolutions followed by seven UNSC resolutions condemning Israel's attempted annexation of East Jerusalem.  In particular, UNSC res 478 notes Israel's non-compliance with United Nations Security Council Resolution 476 and condemned Israel's 1980 Jerusalem Law which declared Jerusalem to be Israel's "complete and united" capital, as a violation of international law. The resolution states that the council will not recognize this law, and calls on member states to accept the decision of the council.  This resolution also calls upon member states to withdraw their diplomatic missions from the city.

The resolution was passed with 14 votes to none against, with the United States abstaining.

Reception and criticism
Israel categorically rejected the resolution and its Foreign Ministry announced "It will not undermine the status of Jerusalem as the capital of a sovereign Israel and as a united city which will never again be torn apart".

In remarks made to the council, then-U.S. Secretary of State Edmund Muskie said "The question of Jerusalem must be addressed in the context of negotiations for a comprehensive, just and lasting Middle East peace."

With respect to the section of the draft resolution relating to the transfer of embassies from Jerusalem, the Secretary of State said that the resolution was "fundamentally flawed" and that the U.S. considered that the instruction that states remove their diplomatic missions from Jerusalem, "not binding" and "without force", and that "we reject it as a disruptive attempt to dictate to other nations."  He also said that the United States would forcefully resist any attempt to impose sanctions on Israel under Chapter VII of the Charter.

Shlomo Slonim said that despite its forceful tone, Muskie's statement did not really elucidate the American position on Jerusalem. It made no reference to Jerusalem as an occupied territory, but neither did it deny such a status. He noted that America's policy regarding Jerusalem at the end of 1980 continued to be marked by a considerable degree of ambiguity and confusion.

Decisions regarding illegal situations

Two of the decisions contained in the resolution concerned the illegality of the Basic Law Jerusalem and violations of the Geneva Convention which are regarded as serious violations of customary international law. The Repertory of Practice of United Nations Organs is a legal publication, which analyzes and records the decisions of the UN organs. It states that the decisions were adopted by the Security Council acting on behalf of the members under Article 24. Although they were not adopted under Chapter VII of the Charter, the organization considers determinations regarding illegal situations to be binding upon all of its members. The Repertory says: "The question whether Article 24 confers general powers on the Security Council ceased to be a subject of discussion following the advisory opinion of the International Court of Justice rendered on 21 June 1971 in connection with the question of Namibia (ICJ Reports, 1971, page 16)."

The subsequent advisory opinion of the International Court of Justice expressed the view that all States are under an obligation not to recognize the illegal situation in and around East Jerusalem.

Most nations with embassies in Jerusalem relocated their embassies to Tel Aviv, Ramat Gan or Herzliya following the adoption of Resolution 478. Following the withdrawals of Costa Rica and El Salvador in August 2006, no country maintained its embassy in Jerusalem until May 2018. Following President Trump's announcement in December 2017, the United States relocated their embassy from Tel Aviv to Jerusalem on 14 May 2018.

Full text of Resolution 478

See also
 Jerusalem Embassy Act
 Israeli–Palestinian conflict
 List of United Nations Security Council Resolutions 401 to 500 (1976–1982)
 Positions on Jerusalem
 United Nations General Assembly resolution ES-10/L.22
 United Nations Security Council Resolution 252
 United Nations Security Council Resolution 267
 United Nations Security Council Resolution 271
 United Nations Security Council Resolution 298
 United Nations Security Council Resolution 465
 United Nations Security Council Resolution 476

References

External links
 
 Text of Resolution 478 at undocs.org
 Basic Law: Jerusalem, Capital of Israel (English translation)

 0478
 0478
20th century in Jerusalem
Israeli–Palestinian conflict and the United Nations
August 1980 events